Sun Country Airlines is an American ultra-low-cost passenger and cargo airline, and the eleventh largest in the US by passengers carried. Based at Minneapolis–Saint Paul International Airport with headquarters on airport property, Sun Country operates more than 120 passenger routes between 94 destinations in the United States, Canada, Mexico, Central America and the Caribbean. The airline has focus city operations at Dallas/Fort Worth International Airport and Harry Reid International Airport. On the cargo side, Sun Country is a contract cargo operator for Amazon Air.

History

Early years and bankruptcies (1983–2008) 
Sun Country began flight operations in January 1983 with a single Boeing 727-200 jetliner.  The airline's original staff consisted of sixteen pilots, sixteen flight attendants, three mechanics and one office person. A number of the original employees had previously worked for Braniff International Airways, which ceased operations on May 12, 1982. The company's founder and first President/CEO was Captain Jim Olsen, who also acted as Chief Pilot. His wife, Joan Smith-Olsen, acted as Chief Flight Attendant and Head of Inflight Operations.

In 1988, its headquarters were located on the grounds of the Minneapolis–Saint Paul International Airport.

In 2001, the company suspended operations due to financial troubles.

In July 2006, the airline was acquired by Petters Group Worldwide and Whitebox Advisors.

Following the replacement of interim CEO Jay Salmen by Stan Gadek, former CFO of AirTran Airways, Sun Country was nearly finished by the major recession of 2008 and the revelation of financial fraud. The airline furloughed 45 of its 156 pilots and scaled back its summer schedule due to rising fuel costs. Sun Country indicated it had hoped to get up to $50 million in loans or other financial help from the state of Minnesota and the airports commission. In September 2008 the carrier reduced, and in some cases eliminated, flights to San Francisco and Los Angeles. It also began charging for the first checked bag. At the end of September 2008, Gadek called for a 50% pay-deferral to all remaining employees. Tom Petters resigned after an FBI probe discovered that the airline had suffered financial fraud on a massive scale. Following this, the airline filed for Chapter 11 bankruptcy protection for the second time, on October 6, 2008.

Rebuilding and Davis brothers ownership (2011–2017) 
In July 2011, Sun Country was bought out of bankruptcy for $34 million by the Davis family, owners of Cambria, a Minnesota-based countertop company.  Marty Davis, CEO of Cambria, became chairman.

In 2015, the Sun Country board hired Zarir Erani as president and CEO. The airline had a net income of $27 million in 2015, followed by a 41% drop to $16 million in 2016.

In July 2017, after more than a year of missed monthly earnings projections, Davis replaced Erani as interim President and CEO, with Erani moving to other duties within the Davis family of companies. Jude Bricker, previously of Allegiant Air, was appointed as CEO one week after Erani stepped down. As part of its strategy, Sun Country had begun to move towards being a "no frills" airline.

Apollo Global Management ownership (2017–present) 
On December 14, 2017, the Davis brothers announced they would be selling the airline to funds affiliated with New York Based Apollo Global Management for an undisclosed amount.

On December 17, 2019, Amazon Air bought a minority stake in Sun Country from Apollo, with plans for the airline to operate cargo flights under the Amazon Air brand. As Sun Country's passenger model is heavily leisure focused, this deal is designed to help stabilize revenues during non-peak seasons.

In December 2019 Sun Country announced they would begin operating cargo flights for Amazon. Sun Country will initially operate ten cargo jets for Amazon Air. The airline operated their first cargo flight for Amazon in May 2020.

On March 17, 2021, Sun Country became publicly listed and traded on the NASDAQ under the ticket SNCY.

Corporate affairs

Business trends 
Recent key figures for Sun Country Airlines Holdings, Inc. (which include the passenger operations of Sun Country Airlines and its cargo business for Amazon Air) are (years ending December 31):

Services 
Sun Country previously offered two classes of service with First Class and Economy seats, but when the airline was sold to Apollo Global Management, they changed the airline to an ultra-low-cost carrier with aircraft operated in an all-economy configuration. Sun Country now offers three variations of economy seats: Best, Exit Row, and Standard. 

Sun Country ran its first frequent flyer program, Sun Country VIP Club, from 2004 to July 2007, when it was replaced by Ufly. Ufly was replaced by Sun Country Rewards from November 2018.

Destinations 

As of March 2022, Sun Country Airlines flies to 81 destinations and operates more than 100 routes throughout the Caribbean, United States, Canada, Mexico and Central America. Many Sun Country destinations are seasonally served as demand grows and falls throughout the year. 

The airline additionally provides charter service for the United States Armed Forces and NCAA football teams.

Sun Country also has interline agreements with China Airlines, Condor, EVA Air, Hawaiian Airlines, and Icelandair.

Fleet

Current fleet 
, the Sun Country Airlines fleet consists entirely of Boeing 737 Next Generation aircraft.

Historical fleet

See also 
 Air transportation in the United States

References

External links 

 

1982 establishments in Minnesota
2001 disestablishments in Minnesota
2002 establishments in Minnesota
Airlines established in 1982
Airlines disestablished in 2001
Airlines established in 2002
Airlines based in Minnesota
Companies that filed for Chapter 11 bankruptcy in 2001
Companies that filed for Chapter 11 bankruptcy in 2008
Dakota County, Minnesota
Low-cost carriers
Companies listed on the Nasdaq
Re-established companies